Cristinel Vasile Pojar (born 19 August 1967) is a Romanian former footballer who spent his entire career at Universitatea Cluj. After he ended his playing career he worked as an assistant coach.

Playing career

Cristinel Pojar was born on 19 August 1967 in Jucu, Cluj County, and started playing junior level football at Universitatea Cluj, a team which he would spent all of his senior career that started in the 1984–85 Divizia B season as the team finished it on the first position, thus earning promotion to Divizia A where he made his debut under coach Remus Vlad on 14 September 1985 in a 1–0 away loss in front of Universitatea Craiova. At the end of the 1990–91 season, the team relegated back to Divizia B but Pojar stayed with the club, helping it obtain promotion back to the first league after only one year. At age 27 he suffered a injury which kept him off the field for two years and after he started playing again he suffered a cruciate ligament injury, having a total of 7 operations at his knees, eventually retiring because of these problems by the end of the 1997–98 season, having a total of 174 Divizia A matches with four goals scored and 20 appearances with four goals in Divizia B, receiving a single red card in his whole career. Pojar also played one game for Romania's under-21 football team when he was sent at halftime by coach Mircea Rădulescu in order to replace Marcel Sabou in a 3–0 loss in front of Norway. In October 2011 in order to inaugurate the new Cluj Arena stadium, "U" Cluj organized a friendly match with the team where Pojar was working as a assistant, Kuban Krasnodar and with this occasion the match was also used as the retirement match for Pojar as he played again a few minutes for "U" Cluj, the game ending with a 4–0 loss in front of the Russians.

Coaching career
Cristinel Pojar started working as a assistant coach for Tiberiu Poraczky at Universitatea Cluj in the 1998–99 Divizia A season, afterwards working again for the same team, this time with Ioan Sabău in the 2000–01 Divizia C season, helping the team earn promotion to Divizia B. In 2004 he started to work as a assistant of Dan Petrescu at Sportul Studențesc, following him in Poland at Wisła Kraków, returned back to Romania at Unirea Urziceni where they won the 2008–09 Liga I title, afterwards working in Russia at Kuban Krasnodar and Dynamo Moscow.

Honours
Universitatea Cluj
Divizia B: 1984–85, 1991–92

See also 
 List of one-club men in association football

References

1967 births
People from Cluj County
Romanian footballers
Romania under-21 international footballers
Association football defenders
Liga I players
Liga II players
FC Universitatea Cluj players
Living people